Don Mee Choi is a Korean-American poet and translator.

Life
Don Mee Choi was born in Seoul, South Korea and now lives in Leipzig, Germany. In addition to her own poetry, she is a prolific translator of modern Korean women poets, including several books by Kim Hyesoon.

Awards
 2011: Whiting Award
 2012: Lucien Stryk Asian Translation Prize for All the Garbage of the World, Unite! by Kim Hyesoon
 2016: Lannan Literary Fellowship Award
 2019: Griffin Poetry Prize Award for translation of Autobiography of Death from the Korean written by Kim Hyesoon
 2020: National Book Award for Poetry for DMZ Colony
 2021: Guggenheim Fellowship Poetry
 2021: MacArthur Fellows  Program
2021: Royal Society of Literature International Writer

Works

Books
 The Morning News is Exciting, Action Books, 2010, 
 Petite Manifesto, Vagabond Press, 2014 (chapbook)
 Hardly War, Wave Books, 2016
 DMZ Colony, Wave Books, 2020

Translations
 Mommy Must Be a Fountain of Feathers by Kim Hyesoon, Action Books, 2005
 Anxiety of Words: Contemporary Poetry by Korean Women, Zephyr Press, 2006
 All the Garbage of the World, Unite! by Kim Hyesoon, Action Books, 2011
 Sorrowtoothpaste Mirrorcream by Kim Hyesoon, Action Books, 2014
 I'm OK, I'm Pig! by Kim Hyesoon, Bloodaxe Books, 2014
 Autobiography of Death by Kim Hyesoon, Bloodaxe Books, 2018 (winner of the 2019 Griffin Poetry Prize)

Anthology
Yasuhiro Yotsumoto Ming Di Don Mee Choi, Shuntaro Tanikawa, Hyesoon Kim, Trilingual Renshi, Vagabond Press, 2015,

References

External links
 New York Times review of Hardly War https://www.nytimes.com/2016/04/24/books/review/hardly-war-by-don-mee-choi.html?_r=0
 Profile at the Whiting Foundation

21st-century American poets
Living people
Year of birth missing (living people)